Washington Square is a  mixed-use neighborhood under construction in downtown Bellevue, Washington, United States. The community is planned to be "pedestrian friendly" and feature a dog park, fountain, landscaping, and walkways.

The first phase, which includes two residential towers, was completed in the fall of 2008. Tower one and Tower two are 24 and 26 stories respectively. Washington Square is the third chapter in the Bellevue redesign following the Bellevue Square and Lincoln Square projects.

Additional phases of this superblock have not yet been scheduled for construction.

Location and history
The  site is bounded by NE 8th and NE 10th Streets to the north and south and 108th Avenue NE and 106 Avenue NE to the east and west. Developer Eugene Horback acquired the properties comprising the block over a 17-year period spanning the 1980s, 1990s, and 2000s. Following the technology recession in the late 1990s the project faced bankruptcy. In an effort to save the project from foreclosure, Horback brought in Utah based partner Dell Loy Hansen and his company Wasatch Development Associates to help save the block. BV Holdings in September 2002 acquired the superblock from E&H Properties Inc., the company owned by developer Eugene Horbach, for $30 million. Horback died in 2004 shortly after development began.

Retail space
Tenants in the first  to be completed are Top Pot Doughnuts and Shnoo Yogurt.

Column spacing
The two towers at Washington Square are constructed of steel reinforced concrete and are classified as "Type I Construction". Each tower is 24-stories to ensure slab thicknesses and columns spacing at efficiencies that match the seismic and wind loading in the Northwest. By post-tensioning the tower floor slabs the weight is reduced and the greater column spacing offers unit layouts with greater circulation and exterior views than if the columns were closer together.

Seismic structure
DCI, the structural engineers for the Washington Square project, suggested an innovative structural system that further improved upon efficiency of a concrete tower and resulted in a stronger tower that was better able to address the seismic requirements of the building code. The concrete "shear core" which is normally located around the elevator shaft in high-rise construction was moved out from the elevator/stair core to the perimeter of the interior hallway which made it structurally stronger because of its larger cross section. By doing this, DCI eliminated additional columns and created quieter residential units because separating the public corridor from the individual units is a  wall of very dense concrete. Washington Square was built to Seismic Category "D" which being one of the most stringent categories is intended to withstand an earthquake of 7–8 on the Richter Scale.

Exterior curtain wall and windows
The curtain wall system is a six million upgrade. Because the exterior is unencumbered by rectangular columns, it can be clad with a "curtain wall system" that is a metal panel with insulation within the panel itself. The curtain wall is hung from the edge of the building further isolating the interior from thermal extremes. In addition to the sleek exterior aesthetics, in a curtain wall system there are very few ledges or caulk joints through which moisture can enter. The Low E glass coating helps block the UV rays in the summer and keeps heat in during the winter.

References

External links

Skyscrapers in Bellevue, Washington
Residential skyscrapers in Washington (state)